The .600 Nitro Express Zeliska revolver is an Austrian single-action revolver produced by Pfeifer Waffen. The cylinder alone weighs . The Zeliska is one of the most powerful handguns in the world, producing a muzzle energy of 4,592 foot pounds (revolvers chambered in the .500 Bushwhacker generate a somewhat higher level of power, however). The weight of the handgun helps control the recoil, making controlled shooting possible. The capacity of a Zeliska is five .600 Nitro Express or .458 Win Mag rounds. The Zeliska fires a 900 grain (58.32 g) .600 Nitro Express slug at 1,516 ft/s (462 m/s, 1,663.2 km/h). The cost of a Zeliska revolver is $17,316. Each .600 Nitro Express round costs $40, making this gun very expensive to fire.

Loading is accomplished through a loading gate located on the right of the cylinder, similar to the Colt Single Action Army, upon which the Zeliska largely is based.

Added features to the gun include gold-plated hammer, cylinder pivot, action and the gold-filled inscription on the gun indicating the company's address.

References

External links
 Specifications LINK NO LONGER EXISTS

Revolvers